Chishma (Şişmä) is a rural locality (a selo) and the administrative center of Chishminsky Selsoviet, Birsky District, Bashkortostan, Russia. The population was 596 as of 2010.

Geography 
It is located 25 km from Birsk.

References 

Rural localities in Birsky District